The Pine Street Historic District is a  historic district encompassing a residential section of the township of Montclair and extending into the borough of Glen Ridge, both in Essex County, New Jersey. It is roughly bounded by Glenridge Avenue, the NJ TRANSIT Boonton Line, Pine and Baldwin Streets. The district, also known as the Montclair Working Class Housing Historic District, was added to the National Register of Historic Places on March 16, 2000 for its significance in architecture and social history. The district includes 107 contributing buildings.

See also
 National Register of Historic Places listings in Essex County, New Jersey

References

External links

Montclair, New Jersey
Glen Ridge, New Jersey
National Register of Historic Places in Essex County, New Jersey
Historic districts on the National Register of Historic Places in New Jersey
New Jersey Register of Historic Places